François Laurent Joseph André Campana (21 May 1886 – 12 November 1931) was a French athlete. He competed in the long jump at the 1912 Summer Olympics and finished 16th.

References

External links
 

1886 births
1931 deaths
French male long jumpers
Athletes (track and field) at the 1912 Summer Olympics
Olympic athletes of France
Athletes from Paris